Gordon James Brown is a Scottish author of primarily crime fiction.

Early life and education
Brown attended King's Park Secondary school in Glasgow, before graduating from the University of Strathclyde.

Before publishing his novels, he has previously worked with several companies, including e-comsport and Bass Export, and has been the head of marketing at Tennent's Lager. He then set up Circuit Break, a company specialising in marketing strategy, planning and advice, and is also a director of Worn Out Limited as well as Brain Juice Limited.

Career
Brown's first novel, Falling, was published in June 2009. Telling the story of a man who becomes involved in a life of crime that he did not wish to be part of, resulting in him being thrown from the roof of a building, it received positive reviews from The Herald and the Daily Record in Scotland.

Following the success of the first novel a second, titled 59 Minutes, was released in September 2010. It once again received positive reviews.

Both Falling and 59 Minutes have been published by Fledgling Press.

The Catalyst, his third novel and the first starring Craig McIntyre, was released in May 2013. Following this his fourth novel, Meltdown, was released in December 2014.

In 2016, Brown moved publisher to Strident, who took up the options on The Catalyst, Meltdown and the third, untitled book in the Craig McIntyre series. Working with Brown, Strident have completely re-worked the two original books and re-titled them. As a result, all three books were released as follows:

Darkest Thoughts - April 2017
Furthest Reaches - September 2017
Deepest Wounds - February 2018

In the U.S., Down & Out Books picked up the rights to Falling and published it in 2016. The sequel - Falling Too - was commissioned for publication in the U.S. in September 2017.

In March 2019 Brown released a fourth instalment in the McIntyre series, Highest Lives,
published by Strident.

Brown has also been published in the 'Blood on the Bayou' Anthology to celebrate Bouchercon 2016.

In late 2019 Brown was signed to Polygon, an imprint of Birlinn Ltd for a new crime thriller called ‘Thirty-One Bones’ set in the fictional town of El Descaro in Spain – to be published on 11 June 2020.

In addition, Brown had an on-line episodic, 15,000 word story, written in conjunction with author Douglas Skelton, published by Polygon in May 2020.

In May 2022 'Six Wounds', the second in the Daniella Coulstoun series was published by Polygon.

In November 2021 Brown signed a two book deal with Red Dog Press to publish two new crime novels under the name Gordon J. Brown. The first, 'Any Day Now' was published on 9th Sept 2022 with the second, 'No More Games' due early 2023.

Personal life

Brown has a Post Graduate Diploma in Management Studies and an MBA. He currently lives in Glasgow with his wife, but splits his time between the UK and Spain. He was one of the founders of Bloody Scotland, a Scottish crime writer's festival, which has been held annually in Stirling since 2012.

Bibliography

References

External links
 Official website

Scottish crime fiction writers
Living people
Year of birth missing (living people)